Gocławek is an officially designated neighbourhood within the Warsaw district of Praga Południe. It is located in the north-eastern part of Praga-Południe.

The architecture of the neighbourhood is typical of the suburbs of the city, the oldest buildings date from the period of the November Uprising.

Neighbourhoods of Praga-Południe